Trenton is a historic railroad station located in Trenton, Mercer County, New Jersey, United States. The station was built in 1888 by the Philadelphia and Reading Railroad. It was located on the railroad's Trenton Branch. It was added to the National Register of Historic Places on May 14, 1979, as the Philadelphia and Reading Railroad Freight Station.

See also
National Register of Historic Places listings in Mercer County, New Jersey

References

Railway stations in the United States opened in 1888
Buildings and structures in Trenton, New Jersey
Railway buildings and structures on the National Register of Historic Places in New Jersey
Railway freight houses on the National Register of Historic Places
Former Reading Company stations
Former railway stations in New Jersey
National Register of Historic Places in Trenton, New Jersey
New Jersey Register of Historic Places
Railway stations in Mercer County, New Jersey
1888 establishments in New Jersey